Grudge Training Center (GTC) was a mixed martial arts training center founded by coach Trevor Wittman in 2009. Originally located in Wheat Ridge, Colorado, GTC relocated to Arvada, Colorado in 2013. The gym was an affiliate of Jackson's Submission Fighting. Wittman closed Grudge in November 2016.

Notable fighters

Rose Namajunas  – Former 2x UFC Women's Strawweight Champion
Nate Marquardt  – UFC
Pat Barry  – UFC
Justin Gaethje  – UFC Former Interim Lightweight champion
Brandon Girtz  – Bellator
Justin Salas  – UFC
Luke Caudillo  – Strikeforce, UFC
Tyler Stinson  – Bellator, Strikeforce
Brandon Thatch  – UFC
Justin Wren  – Bellator
Shane Carwin  – Former UFC Interim Heavyweight champion
Rashad Evans  – UFC Hall of Famer
Duane Ludwig  – UFC
Ed Herman  – UFC
Todd Duffee  – UFC
Melvin Guillard  – UFC
Brendan Schaub  – runner-up on The Ultimate Fighter: Heavyweights
Jon Jones  – UFC Former Light-Heavyweight Champion
Gerald Harris  – WSOF
John Howard  – UFC
Jared Hamman  – UFC
Tyler Toner  – UFC
James McSweeney  – UFC
Paul Buentello  – Bellator, Shark Fights
Cody Donovan  – UFC
Eliot Marshall  – UFC
Alvin Robinson  – UFC

Notable and recurring trainees under Trevor Wittman
Stipe Miocic  – UFC Former Heavyweight Champion
Neil Magny  – UFC
Donald Cerrone  – UFC
Georges St-Pierre  – Former UFC Welterweight & Middleweight Champion

References

External links

Mixed martial arts training facilities